First lieutenant Duane Francies (July 15, 1921 – May 5, 2004) was a military aviator who earned the Distinguished Flying Cross for his service.

Early life
He was the only son of Merritt Charles Francies and Kathleen Horan Francies. Duane witnessed the landing of Clyde Pangborn and Hugh Herndon after the first nonstop trans-Pacific flight, driving his desire to be a pilot. After graduation from  Wenatchee High School in 1939, he attended Seattle Pacific College and Wenatchee Valley College where he had civilian pilot training.

Military service

Three days after Pearl Harbor, Francies enlisted with the Army. Along with his observer William Martin,  both used their Colt 45 to down a German Storch on April 11, 1945. This story was related in Cornelius Ryan's book The Last Battle (Ryan) in 1966. Twice recommended for a Distinguished Flying Cross during the war, it was not until Scoop Jackson took up the issue and the medal was awarded in 1967.(Martin had already been awarded the DFC years before)

Later life
After WW2, Francies worked for Foote Mineral Co. for 23 years. He was a member of Sigma Phi Epsilon fraternity, Kiwanis, Experimental Aircraft Association, and member of St. Andrews Episcopal Church.

External links
 5th Armored Division

References

Recipients of the Legion of Merit
Recipients of the Distinguished Flying Cross (United States)
1921 births
2004 deaths
People from Wenatchee, Washington
United States Army personnel of World War II